Liverovići is a village in the municipality of Nikšić, Montenegro. It is located at Lake Liverovići.

Demographics
According to the 2011 census, its population was 279.

By 2018 the population had increased to 433.

References

Populated places in Nikšić Municipality